Decoding Shankar is a multiple time international award winning film documentary about Shankar Mahadevan directed by Deepti Sivan Pillay which portraits the full life story of Shankar Mahadevan and casts Shankar Mahadevan, Amitabh Bachchan, Aamir Khan, Javed Akhtar, Shreya Ghoshal etc. The film documentary is screened at many international film festivals including Stuttgart International Film Festival at Germany, Jecheon International Music and Film Festival, South Korea, and many film festivals in USA and Canada.

Awards and Honor
 Got nomination to Indian Panorama-2018.
 Selected to Toronto International Film Festival
 Best Biographical Film award in the Toronto International Women Film Festival 
 Special Jury Award at the Indo French International Film Festival

References

Biographical documentary films
Documentary films about singers